Elm River refers to several places:

Rivers
Elm River (Illinois)
Elm River (Michigan)
Elm River (North Dakota–South Dakota), a river in North Dakota and South Dakota
 Rivière à l'Orme (English: Elm River), a tributary of Lac des Deux Montagnes, in Montreal, Quebec]], Canada

Inhabited Places
Elm River Township, Michigan

See also
Elm River Township (disambiguation)
Elm Creek (disambiguation)
Elm (disambiguation)